Damian Roderic Todd (born 29 August 1959) is a career British diplomat who has served as Ambassador to Slovakia, Ambassador to Poland, Governor of the Turks and Caicos Islands and High Commissioner to Cyprus.

Personal and Career
Todd attended Lawrence Sheriff School, Rugby, then studied History at Worcester College, Oxford, and entered the Diplomatic Service in 1980. His diplomatic postings included:

 1981–1984 British diplomat in South Africa in Cape Town and Pretoria
 1985–1987 Foreign and Commonwealth Office (FCO), European Department
 1987–1989 British Embassay in Prague, Czechoslovakia
 1989–1991 FCO, Economic Relations Department
 1991–1995 British Consulate in Bonn, Germany
 1995–1997 HM Treasury and head of 2 EU policy departments
 1997–1998 FCO, Deputy Head of Economic Relations Department
 1998–2001 HM Treasury and head of 2 EU policy departments
 1999–2001 British representative on the European Union Economic Policy Committee 
 2001–2004 British Ambassador to Slovak Republic
 2004–2007 FCO, Finance Director
 2007–2011 Ambassador to Republic of Poland
 2010–2011 Regional Director for FCO Central Europe Network
 2011–2013 Governor of the Turks and Caicos Islands
 2014–2016 High Commissioner to Republic of Cyprus

In 2016 Todd left his post in Cyprus for personal reasons. He was replaced by Matthew Kidd who had preceded Todd as High Commissioner.

Criticism
Many Turks Islanders, including the Turks and Caicos Islands Conservation Society, criticized Todd's environmental record. While acting as Governor of Turks and Caicos, Ric Todd unilaterally amended a long-standing provision in Turks and Caicos law that prohibited the importation (and non-natural exploitation) of marine mammals in Turks and Caicos. 
Despite the United Kingdom's ban on performing captive animals, Todd's amendment specifically allows for the importation and use of marine mammals for the purpose of "display, exhibition and performance" – the principal marine mammal this may be targeted towards is a likely dolphin attraction.

References

1959 births
Living people
People educated at Lawrence Sheriff School
Alumni of Worcester College, Oxford
Ambassadors of the United Kingdom to Slovakia
Ambassadors of the United Kingdom to Poland
Governors of the Turks and Caicos Islands
High Commissioners of the United Kingdom to Cyprus
People from Crawley